Shadowfax was a new-age/electronic musical group formed in Chicago in the early 1970s and best known for their albums Shadowfax and Folksongs for a Nuclear Village. In 1989, they won the Grammy for Best New Age Performance for Folksongs for a Nuclear Village. In 1993, they were nominated for the Grammy for Esperanto.

The group formed in 1972 and disbanded after 1995 when Lyricon player and leader Chuck Greenberg died of a heart attack. Having lost their signature sound, Shadowfax's members went on to other projects.

The group took its name from Gandalf the Grey's horse Shadowfax in J. R. R. Tolkien's The Lord of the Rings.

Members 
 Chuck Greenberg – lyricon, saxophone, flute (1974-1995)
 Armen Chakmakian – keyboards (1990-1995)
 David Lewis – keyboards (1984-1990)
 G. E. Stinson – guitars (1974-1990)
 Charlie Bisharat – electric violin (1986-1990)
 Phil Maggini – double bass, bass guitar, vocals (1974-1995)
 Stuart Nevitt – drums, percussion (1974-1995)
 Doug Maluchnik - Acoustic Grand, Baldwin & Rhodes, ARP 2600, Mini Moog, Oberheim, digital sequencer, harpsichord, chamberlin

Additional musicians
 Emil Richards – percussion (1982-1992)
 Ramon Yslas – percussion
 Andy Abad – guitars
 Doug Maluchnik – keyboards
 Jared Stewart – keyboards (1983)
 Jamii Szmadzinski - electric violin (1983-1986)
 Jerry Goodman – violin
 Mark Martinez – bass

Discography 
 1976 – Watercourse Way (re-mixed and partially re-recorded 1985)
 1982 – Shadowfax
 1983 – Shadowdance
 1984 – The Dreams of Children
 1986 – Too Far to Whisper
 1988 – Folksongs for a Nuclear Village
 1990 – The Odd Get Even
 1992 – Esperanto
 1994 – Magic Theater
 1995 – Live
 2019 – Live at the Wise Fools Pub 1978
 2019 – The Lost Years

Notes
 Greenberg, Joy (2006) A Pause in the Rain 
 Larkin, Colin (1995) The Guinness Encyclopedia of Popular Music 
 Yurochko, Bob (1993) A Short History of Jazz

References

External links 
 Chuck Greenberg Official Site Maintained by his widow Joy Horner Greenberg
 Official website for Armen Chakmakian
 
 

1972 establishments in Illinois
1995 disestablishments in Illinois
Electronic music groups from Illinois
American new-age music groups
Chamber jazz ensembles
Grammy Award winners
Windham Hill Records artists
Private Music artists
Musical groups established in 1972
Musical groups disestablished in 1995
Things named after Tolkien works